Lyces eterusialis is a moth of the family Notodontidae first described by Francis Walker in 1864. It is found on the slopes of the Andes east of Bogotá, Colombia.

External links
Species page at Tree of Life Web Project

Notodontidae
Moths described in 1864